Conflict of Interest is the third studio album by British rapper Ghetts, released on 19 February 2021 by Ghetts Limited and Warner Records. It includes guest appearances from Skepta, Dave, Wretch 32, Giggs, Stormzy, Ed Sheeran, Emeli Sandé, and more.

Release and promotion
Ghetts announced Conflict of Interest on 28 January 2021 alongside its cover art, tracklist and release date. Five singles were released prior to the album: "Mozambique" featuring Jaykae and Moonchild Sanelly, "IC3" featuring Skepta, "Proud Family", "Skengman" featuring Stormzy and "No Mercy" featuring BackRoad Gee and Pa Salieu. A two-part documentary titled The Evolution of Ghetts was released on YouTube.

Critical reception

At Metacritic, which assigns a normalised rating out of 100 based on reviews from mainstream critics, Conflict of Interest received a score of 95 out of 100, based on reviews from 7 critics. In a five-star review, Kyann-Sian Williams of NME concluded Conflict of Interest is Ghetts' "most earnest record to date", adding that "The rapper's third studio record and first on a major label, showcasing his growth over nearly two decades in the game, proves lyricism is in rude health." Alexis Petridis of The Guardian praised the album's production, stating: "The arrangements are beautifully done, subtle rather than showy, a key factor in establishing the album's overwhelming mood." Petridis concluded that "Conflict of Interest feels like the work of an artist who's in it for the long haul rather than short-term rewards."

Track listing

Notes
 "Fire and Brimstone" features additional vocals by Dizzee Rascal.
 "Proud Family" features additional vocals by Zahrah Anderson.

Personnel

Performers
 Ghetts – primary artist 
 Jaykae – featured artist 
 Moonchild Sanelly – featured artist 
 Skepta – featured artist 
 Aida Lae  – featured artist 
 Ed Sheeran – featured artist 
 Emeli Sandé – featured artist 
 Stormzy – featured artist 
 BackRoad Gee – featured artist 
 Pa Salieu – featured artist 
 Giggs – featured artist 
 Miraa May – featured artist 
 Dave – featured artist 
 Hamzaa – featured artist 
 Wretch 32 – featured artist 

Technical
 TJ Amadi – executive producer, production
 Shezhed Zar – programming
 Wez Clarke – mixing
 Joe LaPorta – mixing, mastering
 Ian Opuku – piano
 Rio Willis – programming
 Swindle – string recording engineer, horns engineer
 Neil Waters – string arranger
 Kadeem Clarke – guitar
 Joe Hirst – mixing
 Ten Billion Dreams – production, additional mixing

Charts

References

2021 albums
Ghetts albums